Ruth Hellerud-Brown (born September 22, 1957) is considered the architect of Women's rugby union in Canada. She was a member of the first Canada women's national rugby union team in 1987 and earned 11 caps, having captained the team nine times. She was the Canadian captain in the 1991 Women's Rugby World Cup. Hellerud-Brown played provincial rugby for Alberta, Saskatchewan, and British Columbia.

Her contribution and impact on the sport are recognized in naming the British Columbia Rugby Union Senior Women's premier competition in her name. In 2018, she was inducted in the Rugby Canada Hall of Fame in the builder category.

Hellrud-Brown studied dietetics at the University of British Columbia. She first started playing the game in 1979.

References

Canadian female rugby union players
Canada women's international rugby union players
1957 births
Living people